Municipal and regional elections were held in Peru on 7 October 2018. In the election, Peruvians voted for governors, vice  governors and regional councilors at a regional level while at a municipal level, citizens voted for mayors and municipal councilors. Those elected took office 1 January 2019 and serve their term until 31 December 2022.

Race summary 

Jorge Muñoz Wells of Popular Action was elected Mayor of Lima.

Popular Force, the party of Keiko Fujimori which held the majority in the Congress of the Republic of Peru at the time, saw little success in the elections. The party saw no candidates elected into Lima or regional governments within Peru.

See also
 Lima municipal elections 2018

References

2018
2018
2018 in Peru
2018 elections in South America
October 2018 events in South America